is a railway station in the town of Happō, Akita Prefecture, Japan. It is operated by the East Japan Railway Company (JR East).

Lines

Station layout
The station has two opposed side platforms connected by a level crossing, serving two tracks. It is administered by Noshiro Station, and operated by JR Akita Total Life Service Co., Ltd. Ordinary tickets, express tickets, and reserved-seat tickets are on sale for all JR lines.

History

Iwadate Station was opened on 24 November 1926. With the privatization of the JNR on April 1, 1987, the station has been managed by JR East.

Passenger statistics
In fiscal 2016, the station was used by an average of 26 passengers daily (boarding passengers only).

Surrounding area
 
 Iwadate Post office

See also
List of railway stations in Japan

References

External links

 Iwadate Station tourist information by JR East 
 JR East station information 

Railway stations in Japan opened in 1926
Railway stations in Akita Prefecture
Gonō Line
Happō, Akita